= Milam Ridge =

Coordinates: 37°30′25″N 81°17′51″W

Milam Ridge (elevation: 2,825 feet (861 m)) is a ridge in the U.S. state of West Virginia.

Milam Ridge most likely was named after one Mr. Milam, a pioneer settler.
